Abdoul Khaled Akiola Adénon (born 29 July 1985) is a professional footballer who plays as a defender for Cypriot First Division club Doxa Katokopias FC. Born in Ivory Coast, he is a member of the Benin national team.

Club career
Adénon was born in Abidjan, Ivory Coast. He started his career with Ivorian side ASEC Mimosas, moving to France with Le Mans FC in 2008. He made his senior debut with Le Mans in a Ligue 1 match against AS Nancy on 19 October 2008. He joined Ligue 2 side SC Bastia on loan for the 2009–10 season on 3 July 2009. He returned to Le Mans at the end of the loan, and went on to complete 68 Ligue 1 and Ligue 2 appearances for the club.

On 10 June 2012, Adénon was sent off during a 2014 World Cup qualifier against Rwanda for assaulting the referee. That August, FIFA suspended him from all competition for a year.

With Le Mans bankrupt at the end of the 2012–13 Ligue 2 season, Adénon was effectively a free agent when his ban expired, and in July 2014 he joined Vendée Luçon Football. A year later he was signed by Amiens SC. He was a regular in the team which saw back-to-back promotions in 2015–16 and 2016–17.

Despite signing a new two-year deal with Amiens SC in the summer of 2018, Adénon signed for Saudi Arabian club Al-Wehda in July 2019, agreeing a two-year contract. He left by mutual consent in February 2020.

In July 2020 Adénon returned to France with US Avranches, re-uniting with manager Frédéric Reculeau, who had given him a chance at Luçon.

On 16 August 2021, he signed with Doxa Katokopias in Cyprus.

International career
Adénon represented his homeland at 2008 Africa Cup of Nations.

He played on the successful 2019 Africa Cup of Nations when the team advanced to the quarterfinals.

Career statistics

Scores and results list Benin's goal tally first, score column indicates score after each Adénon goal.

References

External links
 

1985 births
Living people
Footballers from Abidjan
People with acquired Beninese citizenship
Beninese Muslims
Beninese footballers
Association football defenders
Benin international footballers
2008 Africa Cup of Nations players
2010 Africa Cup of Nations players
2019 Africa Cup of Nations players
Ligue 1 players
Ligue 2 players
Saudi Professional League players
Championnat National players
Cypriot First Division players
ASEC Mimosas players
Le Mans FC players
SC Bastia players
Luçon FC players
Amiens SC players
Al-Wehda Club (Mecca) players
US Avranches players
Doxa Katokopias FC players
Beninese expatriate footballers
Beninese expatriate sportspeople in France
Expatriate footballers in France
Beninese expatriate sportspeople in Saudi Arabia
Expatriate footballers in Saudi Arabia
Beninese expatriate sportspeople in Cyprus
Expatriate footballers in Cyprus